The 1978 Penn Quakers football team was an American football team that represented the University of Pennsylvania during the 1978 NCAA Division I-A football season. Penn finished last in the Ivy League. 

In their eighth year under head coach Harry Gamble, the Quakers compiled a 2–6–1 record and were outscored 187 to 139. Tom Roland and Boris Radisic were the team captains.

Penn's 1–5–1 conference was the worst in the Ivy League standings. The Quakers were outscored 154 to 99 by Ivy opponents. 

Penn played its home games at Franklin Field adjacent to the university's campus in Philadelphia, Pennsylvania.

Schedule

References

Penn
Penn Quakers football seasons
Penn Quakers football